Hands Up! You're Free is an album by Dutch anarcho-punk band The Ex compiling the group's three different Peel sessions recorded for BBC Radio 1 during the 1980s. The Ex released the collection on their own label, Ex Records, first on vinyl in June 1988, then on CD in 2003.

Track list, personnel and recording information

First Peel session: 1983

Songs
1. Crap Rap
2. U.S. Hole
3. Pleased To Meat You
4. Scrub That Scum

Personnel
Terrie (guitar)
G.W. Sok (vocals)
Yoke (bass)
Sabien (drums)
Kees (saxophone)
Wineke (violin)
Dolf Planteijdt (guitar)

First Peel Session produced by Roger Pusey

Second Peel session: 1985

Songs
5. Choice
6. Hands Up! You're Free
7. Butter Or Bombs
8. Uh-Oh Africa

Personnel
Terrie (guitar)
G.W. Sok (vocals)
Luc (bass)
Kat (drums)
Tom Greene (guitar)
Susy Honeyman (violin)
Jon Langford (singing gardensnake)

Second Peel session produced by Dale Griffin.

Third Peel session: 1986

Songs
9. Knock
10. Ignorance
11. A Job/Stupid
12. Business As Usual

Personnel
Terrie (guitar)
G.W. Sok (vocals)
John (vocals)
Luc (bass)
Kat (drums)

Third Peel session produced by Dale Griffin.

1988 albums
The Ex (band) albums